Christopher David Rawes Smith (born 21 February 1998) is an English professional footballer who plays as a defender for Kettering Town.

Club career

Ipswich Town
Born in Ipswich, Smith became a schoolboy player with Ipswich Town in 2006 and then became a full academy player with Town in July 2014, signing a two-year scholarship, before he signed a one-year pro deal in July 2016, and then signed another one-year deal for the 2017–18 season. He made his Ipswich Town debut on 22 August 2017 as a second-half substitute in an EFL Cup match at Crystal Palace. He was released by Ipswich at the end of the 2018–19 season.Following his release from Ipswich Town, he went on to study Mechanical Engineering at Loughborough University, where he achieve a 1st Class Honours degree in 2022.

Chelmsford City (loan)
On 21 September 2017, Smith joined Chelmsford City. He was recalled from his loan period in January 2018. After featuring on the bench twice upon his return to Ipswich, Smith returned on loan to Chelmsford until the end of the season. On 13 April 2018, after making 28 appearances in all competitions for Chelmsford, Smith was once again recalled from loan by Ipswich.

Aldershot Town (loan)
On 26 July 2018, Smith joined National League side Aldershot Town on a short-term loan deal until December 2018.

King's Lynn Town
He signed for King's Lynn Town on 19 July 2019, following his release by Ipswich.

Kettering Town FC 
He signed for Kettering Town FC on 20 June 2021,

Career statistics

Honours
King's Lynn Town
National League North: 2019–20

References

External links

1998 births
Living people
Sportspeople from Ipswich
English footballers
Association football central defenders
Ipswich Town F.C. players
Chelmsford City F.C. players
Aldershot Town F.C. players
King's Lynn Town F.C. players
National League (English football) players